DataCore, also known as DataCore Software, is a developer of software-defined storage based in Fort Lauderdale, Florida, United States. The company is a pioneer in the development of SAN virtualization technology, and offers software-defined storage solutions across core data center, edge and cloud environments.

History
DataCore was founded in Fort Lauderdale in February 1998 by George Teixeira and Ziya Aral, co-workers at parallel computing company Encore Computer. The premise behind the company was to allow network operators to purchase commodity disk drives, external storage arrays or SAN disk drive arrays, and treat them all as virtual disks of networked, block-access storage. This storage was controlled using DataCore software.

They were joined by 10 other former Encore colleagues, and they all worked without pay until January 1999, when the company secured its first funding round, of $8 million.

In 2000, the company had a $35 million Series C funding round.

In 2006, seeing an exodus of venture funding, company employees mortgaged their homes to keep the business going, until 2008 when a US$30 million round of funding stabilized company finances.

In 2011, the company launched SANsymphony-V, an upgrade to its storage virtualization software offering faster performance.

In April 2014, the company released version 10 of its SANsymphony product.

In March 2015, DataCore partnered with Chinese technology vendor Huawei to run SANsymphony-V software on Huawei's FusionServer to create virtual storage networks.

In 2016, the company's SANsymphony-V software was reported to have set new price performance records based on testing done by Redwood City, California-based non-profit testing company Storage Performance Council using their SPC-1 storage performance benchmark. The results led to complaints from multiple vendors, who claimed that storing all the "test" data in cache made the results unfair. One of the three SPC-1 benchmark results was later withdrawn.

In March 2017, the company partnered with technology company Lenovo to develop its data center business by integrating DataCore's SANsymphony software defined storage with Lenovo's servers. This was reportedly to compete with companies like Nutanix and SimpliVity (now part of Hewlett Packard Enterprise (HPE)) that were shipping whole hyper-converged stacks rather than just a software-defined storage component. In September 2017, in an attempt to compete with the in-memory database features of SQL Server, the company released its MaxParallel driver, which uses parallel I/O technology to accelerate database-related processing such as with SQL Server databases. This product has been discontinued in August 2018. 

In April 2018 DataCore announced that Dave Zabrowski, previously CEO of cloud-based financial services company Cloud Cruiser, was its new CEO, and former CEO George Teixeira was named Executive Chairman.

In October 2019, DataCore was awarded a patent for performing parallel I/O operations.

In February 2020, DataCore, together with AME Cloud Ventures and Insight Partners, invested $26 million in Palo Alto-based MayaData. In the same month, DataCore launched a global research and development center in Bangalore, India.

In January 2021, DataCore acquired Caringo, Inc., enabling the company to offer a complete storage solution portfolio including block, file, and object storage. DataCore announced the global availability of DataCore Swarm object storage software in April 2021 as a result of the acquisition. In November 2021, DataCore acquired MayaData, the original developer of cloud-native storage platform OpenEBS and Mayastor.

In May 2022, DataCore launched Bolt, a container-native storage software to deploy and run stateful applications at scale on Kubernetes clusters.

In September 2022, DataCore partnered with Symply to offer the appliance-based in-facility media archiving solution, SymplyPERIFERY. In October 2022, the on-set remote media appliance SymplyTRANSPORTER was announced. These were the first application-centric and media-optimized solutions for edge and high-growth markets launched by DataCore under its Perifery portfolio.

In January 2023, DataCore acquired Object Matrix, an object storage supplier focused on the media and entertainment industry.

Products

 SANsymphony – Virtualizes block storage across storage devices (SAN and HCI) and provides uniform data services across all of them.
 Swarm – On-premises object storage platform and provides data access, delivery, and archiving.
 Bolt – Automates and manages storage services for Kubernetes environments utilizing the benefits of NVMe over Fabrics.
 MatrixStore – Media-focused object storage platform that modernizes video workflows and provides instant access to media assets.

References

External links
 Official website

Computer storage companies
Storage Area Network companies
Companies based in Fort Lauderdale, Florida
Computer companies established in 1998
Storage software
Storage virtualization